Glen's wattled bat (Glauconycteris gleni) is a species of vesper bat in the family Vespertilionidae. It is found in Cameroon and Uganda. Its natural habitat is subtropical or tropical moist lowland forests.

Sources

Glauconycteris
Mammals described in 1973
Bats of Africa
Taxonomy articles created by Polbot